Jithin C. Thomas (born 1 June 1990) is an Indian high jumper.

He won the silver medal at the 2013 Asian Championships.

His personal best is 2.22 metres, achieved in September 2012 in Chennai.

References

1990 births
Living people
Indian male high jumpers
Place of birth missing (living people)
21st-century Indian people